The 1999 Medic Drug Grand Prix of Cleveland was the ninth round of the 1999 CART FedEx Champ Car World Series season, held on June 27, 1999, at the Burke Lakefront Airport in Cleveland, Ohio.

Report

Race 
Pole Sitter and championship leader Juan Pablo Montoya led the early stages of the race until it was struck by a heavy rain shower on lap 33. Multiple cars crashed into the wall or spun, and the race ran under caution while the rain stopped, with Montoya leading from Paul Tracy and Gil de Ferran. When the race went green, de Ferran passed Tracy and then Montoya to take the lead. After the drivers changed to slick tires, Montoya came back at de Ferran and passed him on a restart on lap 69. He was able to pull away and win, the race being stopped on the 2-hour time limit. De Ferran finished second, and Michael Andretti third after a slow second pitstop for Tracy.

Classification

Race

Caution flags

Lap Leaders

Point standings after race

References 

Grand Prix of Cleveland
Cleveland
Medic Drug Grand Prix of Cleveland